Parker Young (born August 16, 1988) is an American actor. He portrayed Ryan Shay on the ABC sitcom Suburgatory, Randy Hill on the Fox sitcom Enlisted and Richard on the Bravo series Imposters. His most recent starring role, he played a former Marine adjusting to civilian life on the CBS sitcom United States of Al.   Young has also modeled for Tommy Hilfiger and Calvin Klein.

Life and career
Parker Young was born in Tucson, Arizona, the eldest of three children of Karl and Zarina Young. He has a brother Nelson and a sister Alexis. He attended Catalina Foothills High School where he was football captain, occupying the position of running back. His interest in theatre surfaced when he was in junior year. After graduating, Young moved to Los Angeles to pursue an acting career while he first planned to attend Pepperdine University.

From 2011 to 2014, Young played the recurring role of dim-witted football jock Ryan Shay on the ABC sitcom Suburgatory. In 2013, he landed a lead role on Fox's military comedy series Enlisted and, in 2015, a recurring role on Arrow.

In 2016, he was cast in the third Bravo original scripted series, Imposters, which premiered on February 7, 2017.

In July 2018, he and his fiancée, Stephanie Webber, welcomed a daughter named Jaxon Orion Young.

In late 2019, Young was cast in a lead role for the CBS sitcom United States of Al, which premiered on April 1, 2021.

Filmography

References

External links
 
 

1988 births
21st-century American male actors
American male film actors
Male models from Arizona
American male television actors
American male triathletes
Living people
Male actors from Tucson, Arizona
Participants in American reality television series